Miren Agur Meabe Plaza (born 1962) is a Basque poet, prose writer, author of books for children and young adults and a translator. In 2021, she was the first author to win the Spanish Ministry of Culture's National Poetry Award for a work in Basque.

Early life and education 
Miren Agur Meabe was born on 7 October 1962, in Lekeitio. She studied teaching and Basque philology, then for some time worked as a teacher in Bilbao.

Career 
For years, Miren Agur Meabe worked as a publisher, heading de Basque office of the Giltza-Edebé publishing house. Later, she quit publishing to focus on writing. She writes poetry, books for children and young adults, but has also published fiction for adults. She had stated that her earliest poetry work was based on copying the style of Rosalía de Castro, as she was the only female poet that appeared in university textbooks at the time.

For her literary work, Meabe has won a number of awards, such as the Lasarte-Oria town council prize for the poetry tome Oi hondarrezko emaikaitz (1991), three Euskadi Literature Prizes for young adult novels Itsaslabarreko etxea (2002), Urtebete itsasargian (2006) and Errepidea (2011) and two Premio de la Crítica awards for poetry books Azalaren kodea (2001) and Bitsa eskuetan (2011). Her children's book Mila magnolia-lore (2010) was included in the IBBY Honour List. In 2021, she was the awarded the National Poetry Prize for Nola gorde errautsa kolkoan. She was the first author to win the prize with a work in Basque. 

Meabe also works as a translator into Basque. She has translated works by such authors as Forough Farrokhzad or Scholastique Mukasonga, and received the Vitoria-Gasteiz Translation Prize twice.

She is a member of the Euskaltzaindia.

Bibliography 
 Desberdinen kluba (Club of the Different), 2022, Ttarttalo
 Cómo guardar ceniza en el pecho (How To Keep Ashes On Your Chest), 2021, Bartleby Editores
 Quema de huesos (Burning Bones), 2021, Consonni
 Katta adarbakarra, 2021, Elkar
 Espuma en las manos (Foam In Hands), 2017, Ediciones Trea
 Tximeletak (Butterflies), 2016, Elkar
 Pase al anochecer (Pass At Dusk), 2016, Hualde Alfaro
 Ros, 2015, Lóguez Ediciones
 Izar-Lapurra (The Star Thief), 2014, Elkar
 Pinpiriñe, 2014, Elkar
 Hartz marmartia (Grumbling Bear), 2014, Elkar
 Timuti jirafa (Timuti Giraffe), 2013, Elkar
 Zisnea eta uhartea (The Swan and the Island), 2013, Elkar
 La carretera (Road), 2012, Erein Argitaletxea
 ¿Qué es el amor, sino... ? (What is love, if not...?), 2011, Lóguez Ediciones
 Una estrella en la sopa (A Star In The Soup), 2008, Edebé
 Un año en el faro (A Year In The Lighthouse), 2006, Lóguez Ediciones
 Supositorios para el lobo (Suppositories For The Wolf), 2006, Edebé
 Cómo corregir a una maestra malvada (How To Correct An Evil Teacher), 2003, Edebé
 Vivo en dos casas (I Live In Two Houses), 2003, Editores asociados
 El código de la piel (The Skin Code), 2000, Bassarai Editions
 La casa del acantilado (The House On The Cliff), 2001, Edebé

References 

1962 births
Living people
20th-century Spanish women writers
21st-century Spanish women writers
20th-century Spanish novelists
21st-century Spanish novelists
Basque women writers
Basque-language poets
Basque novelists
Translators to Basque
Basque translators
20th-century Spanish poets
21st-century Spanish poets